, abbreviated as  or , is a private research university located in Minato, Tokyo, Japan.

It is the oldest institute of western higher education in Japan. Its founder, Fukuzawa Yukichi, originally established it as a school for Western studies in 1858 in Edo.

The university has eleven campuses, primarily in Tokyo and Kanagawa. It has ten undergraduate faculties: Letters, Economics, Law, Business and Commerce, Medicine, Science and Technology, Policy Management, Environment and Information Studies, Nursing and Medical Care, and Pharmacy. There are fourteen graduate schools (listed below) and both on- and off-campus research institutes and facilities.

The university is one of the members of the Top Global University Project (Top Type), funded by the Japanese Ministry of Education, Culture, Sports, Science and Technology. Keio University is also one of the member universities of RU11 and APRU, and it is one of only two Japanese universities (alongside the University of Tokyo) to be a member of the World Economic Forum's Global University Leaders Forum.

Its list of alumni and faculty includes three former prime ministers, two astronauts, six international honorary members of the American Academy of Arts and Sciences, and a Wolf Prize winner. Keio University also produced the largest number of CEOs of companies listed in the first section of Tokyo Stock Exchange and ranks 53rd (in the world) in top 100 Global Executives, according to Times Higher Education's "Alma Master Index 2017".

Overview

Keio traces its history to 1858 when Fukuzawa Yukichi, who had studied the Western educational system at Brown University in the United States, started to teach Dutch while he was a guest of the Okudaira family. In 1868 he changed the name of the school to Keio Gijuku and devoted all his time to education. While Keio's initial identity was that of a private school of Western studies, it expanded and established its first university faculty in 1890, and became known as a leading institute in Japanese higher education. It was the first Japanese university to reach its 150th anniversary, celebrating this anniversary in 2008.

Keio has leading research centres. It has approximately 30 Research Centers located on its five main campuses and at other facilities for advanced research in Japan. Keio University Research Institute at SFC (KRIS) has joined the MIT and the French INRIA in hosting the international W3C.

Mission
In his speech at an alumni gathering on November 1, 1896, Fukuzawa stated the mission of Keio as follows:

Keio Gijuku shouldn't be satisfied with being just one educational institution.
Its mission is expected to be a model of the nobility of intelligence and virtue,
to make clear how it can be applied to its family, society, and nation,
and to take an actual action of this statement.
It expects all students to be leaders in society by the practice of this mission.

Those sentences were given to students as his will and considered as the simple expression of Keio's actual mission.

Academic culture

Keio is known for being the first institution to introduce many modern education practices in Japan.

Keio is the earliest Japanese school that introduced an annual fixed course fee, designed by Fukuzawa.
It initially introduced the culture of speech to Japan, which Japan had never had before. It built Japan's earliest speech house Mita Speech House in 1875 as well.
Keio is regarded as Japan's first university to accept international students. Keio accepted 2 Korean students in 1881 as its (and also Japan's) first international students. 60 Korean students entered in 1883 and 130 Korean students in 1895.

Keio put "" as a foundation of its education. This is meant to be physically and mentally independent, and respect yourself for keeping your virtue. Independence and self-respect are also regarded as Fukuzawa's nature and essence of his education.

 is the other unique culture at Keio. During the late Edo period and the early Meiji period, several private prep schools often used students as assistant teachers and it was called "Learning half and teaching half". Keio also had initially used this system. In the early period of such schools of Western studies, there had been many things to learn not only for students but also professors themselves. Hence there had been occasions when students who had learned in advance had taught other students and even professors. After the proper legal systems for education had been set up, those situations disappeared. However, Fukuzawa thought the essence of academia was and is a continuous learning process, and that more knowledge provided more learning opportunities. Keio respects his thought and established the rule "", which states that there shouldn't be any hierarchy between teachers and learners and that all of the people in Keio Gijuku are in the same company. For this reason, there is still a culture at Keio that all professors and lecturers are officially called with the honorific of "Kun" but never "Teacher" or "Professor".

 is also a uniqueness of Keio. Fukuzawa stated in 1879 that the Keio's success today is because of the collaboration in its company, and "Collaboration in a company" originally came from this article. People in Keio often think that all of the people related to Keio (e.g. professors, students, alumni and their family members) are part of their company, thus they should try to help each other like brothers and sisters. This culture has been often seen especially in the alumni organization called Mita-Kai.

History

 was established in 1858 as a School of Western studies located in one of the mansion houses in Tsukiji by the founder Fukuzawa Yukichi. Its root is considered as the Han school for Kokugaku studies named Shinshu Kan established in 1796. Keio changed its name to "Keio Gijuku" in 1868, which came from the era name "Keio" and "Gijuku" as the translation of Private school. It moved to the current location in 1871, established the Medical school in 1873, and the official university department with Economics, Law and Literacy study in 1890.

In 1886, Keio named Hiromoto Watanabe as the first chancellor of the Imperial University (University of Tokyo). He was the first chancellor of an officially authorized university in Japan. In 1899, Keio sent 6 students to study abroad. In the same year, it accepted three international students from India, Qing-dynasty China, and Thailand. Eight international students entered from Taiwan (which had technically been a territory of the Japanese Empire since 1895) in the following year. Keio was visited by Bengali poet Rabindranath Tagore in 1916. In 1922, Keio was visited by Albert Einstein, who presented a special lecture on the theory of relativity. In 1946, Keio began accepting female students. In 2006, a paper with a Keio undergraduate student as its first listed author was published in the research journal Science.  In 2008, Keio was visited by Prince Charles.

Presidents
Since the president system was established in 1881, Keio has had 20 presidents.

Student body
In 2021, there are 33,469 students at Keio University, with 28,667 undergraduate students and 4,802 graduate students. Although two-thirds of the student body are males, this ratio highly depends on the major (56% of students are female in the Faculty of Letters, for instance. On the other hand, in the School of Medicine, three-quarters of students are men.).

There are 1,908 international students on May 1, 2021, with 874 undergraduate students (3.1% of total undergraduate students (=28,667) ), 861 graduate students (18.0% of total graduate students (=4,802) ) and 173 other students. China is the country which provides the most international students with 1,016, followed by South Korea (436), France (66), Taiwan (51), the United States (36), Indonesia (34), and Germany (29).

Student life

Societies
In Japanese universities, there are student societies called "circles". Although the exact number is not clear, there are over 410 circles in Keio.

Festivals
Keio holds school festivals every year on each campus. The main festival is called "Mita Sai" and is usually held on the Mita campus in late November. Mita Sai includes various academic and recreational activities and also serves as a research workshop for students on the Mita campus. Approximately 200,000 people visit Mita Sai every year.

Athletics
Edward Bramwell Clarke and Tanaka Ginnosuke first introduced Rugby union to Japanese students at Keio University. The game had been played in the treaty ports of Yokohama and Kobe before that, but not between Japanese teams.

The interest of Keio's students in baseball stretches back to the early years of the 20th century. In 1913, an American touring team of players from the New York Giants and the Chicago White Sox played an exhibition game against the Keio team. In a 1932 exhibition game, the Keio team beat the University of Michigan team, which was then touring Japan.
Keio's baseball team plays in the Tokyo Big6 Baseball League (six prominent universities in the Tokyo area).

Association football
Keio University's association football (soccer) team is the most successful team in the history of the Emperor's Cup, although their last triumph was in 1956. They have won nine times, a number no professional team has ever achieved in the tournament.

Kei-So rivalry

Traditionally, there has been a strong rivalry between Keio and Waseda University. There are annually many matches between the two universities in several sports, such as baseball, rowing, rugby, lacrosse, track and field, American football, association football, aikido, karate, basketball, tennis, swimming, fencing, figure skating, ice hockey, and field hockey. These games are called "Kei–So Sen (慶早戦)" or, more generally, "So–Kei Sen (早慶戦)".

The Kei-So baseball rivalry, which dates back more than a century, is especially famous because of its importance in Japanese baseball history. The most famous Kei-So baseball game, which was played on October 16, 1943, was made into a movie titled "The Last Game – the Final So-Kei Sen -" in 2008.

There are two Kei-So baseball games every year, and they are usually broadcast by NHK. There is no lecture on all campuses in Keio on the game day because of the students who want to watch this match. Kei-So baseball games were even visited by Japanese emperors in 1929, 1950 and 1994.

Keio University is one of the most prestigious universities in Japan. Times Higher Education estimates that Keio is in 351–400th place in general academic rankings among world universities.

American football

Scandals 
In October 2016, six male students from Keio Advertisement Society, a long-standing student club famous for its organisation of the Miss Keio pageant contest, were investigated for gang rape during a club activity. An out-of-court settlement was reached and the students were not prosecuted. In May 2018, another three students were arrested for sexual assaults.

In March 2017, a student tennis club was disbanded after a student died of alcohol poisoning during a club activity. Two other Keio students died due to over-drinking in 2012 and 2013.

In June 2017, the school's election committee unconventionally selected Haseyama Akira, a legal history professor who only won second place at the general election among teachers and staff, to be the school's new president, breaking a 50-year convention.

In late 2019, both the American football team and the cheerleading club suspended club activities for "inappropriate behaviours".

In January 2020, it was reported that a former member of the school president's secretarial staff had installed a camera in a female toilet stall on the Mita campus, filming over a thousand videos over 3 months.

Academic rankings

Keio ranks 53rd in the world in the Times Higher Education's Alma Mater Index. It ranks 34th globally in the Center for World University Rankings (CWUR) and 3rd in Asia. Keio is ranked at 58th of the Reuters Top 100 innovative universities worldwide. British Quacquarelli Symonds (QS) company estimates that Keio is ranked the 192nd in QS World University Rankings 2017/18. It is ranked the 45th in QS World University Ranking 2017/18 for Graduate Employability Ranking. In the Asian University Ranking (2015), Quacquarelli Symonds also ranked Keio as 37th in Asia. The Academic Ranking of World Universities (2015), which is compiled by Shanghai Jiao Tong University, ranks Keio 151-175 in the world and 37 in Asia. Keio, with Waseda University, is one of the prominent private universities within Japan. The difficulty level of entrance exams at Keio University is one of the highest among private universities in Japan.

Research performance
According to Thomson Reuters, Keio is the 10th best research university in Japan, and it is the only private university within the Top 15. In addition, Weekly Diamond reported that Keio has the 8th highest research standard in Japan in terms of research fundings per researchers in COE Program, and it is also the only private university within Top 10. The Asahi Shimbun summarized the number of academic papers in Japanese major legal journals by the university, and Keio was ranked 2nd during 2005–2009. Accordingly, Keio is a prominent research university in Japan.

In economics, according to The Asahi Shimbun, Keio's been ranked 7th in Japan in the economic research ranking during 2005–2009. More recently, Repec in January 2011 ranked Keio's Economic department as Japan's 6th best economic research university. Keio has provided 3 presidents of Japanese Economic Association in its 42-year history, and this number is 5th largest.

In addition, Nikkei Shimbun on 2004/2/16 surveyed about the research standards in Engineering studies based on Thomson Reuters, Grants in Aid for Scientific Research and questionnaires to heads of 93 leading Japanese Research Centers, and Keio was placed 8th (research planning ability 4th/informative ability of research outcome 3rd) in this ranking.

Business
Keio ranks second in Japan, for the number of alumni holding CEO positions in Fortune Global 500 companies, according to Mines ParisTech: Professional Ranking of World Universities. Keio is also ranked 1st in Japan for the number of alumni generally holding executive positions (when positions like COO, CFO, CIO etc. are included along with the CEO position) in listed companies of Japan, and this number per student (probability of becoming an executive) is also top.

Keio Business School is Japan's first business school and one of four Japanese schools holding The Association to Advance Collegiate Schools of Business (AACSB) accreditation. Keio was ranked No. 1 in Japan by Nikkei Shimbun. Eduniversal also ranked Keio as the top in Japan (75th in the world). In Eduniversal Keio is one of only 3 Japanese schools categorized in "Universal Business schools with major international influence". In 2012, the Keio Business School became a founding member of the university alliance Council on Business & Society that consists of Tuck School of Business from the USA, the University of Mannheim Business School from Germany, ESSEC Business School from France, Fudan University from China, Fundação Getúlio Vargas from Brazil and Keio Business School.

According to the Weekly Economist's 2010 rankings and the PRESIDENT's article on 16 October 2006, graduates from Keio University have the 3rd best employment rate in 400 major companies, and the alumni's average salary is the 3rd best in Japan.

Accounting
As an extension of Keio's strong business focus, for over 30 years, Keio graduates have been ranked first in Japan in the number of successful national CPA exam applicants.

Medicine
Keio has been influential in Japanese medical societies as well. In fact, there have been 4 presidents of Japan Medical Association related to this university (2 Alumni and 2 professors). This number is the 2nd largest among Japanese medical schools. Keio is one of 2 Japanese universities which provided a president of World Medical Association.

Law
Keio's law faculty is typically ranked among the best in all of Japan along with the University of Tokyo, University of Kyoto, Chuo University, and Hitotsubashi University. In 2010 and 2015, Keio University Law School ranked highest among all Japanese universities for the Bar Exam passage rate. Furthermore, the number of Members of Parliament who graduated Keio has been 3rd in Japan.

Popularity and selectivity
Keio is a popular university in Japan, often considered one of Japan's top two private universities alongside their rival, Waseda University. The number of applicants per place was 11.7 (48260/4098) in 2011 undergraduate admissions. Its entrance difficulty is usually considered as the top with Waseda among 730 private universities.

Nikkei BP has been publishing a ranking system called "Brand rankings of Japanese universities" every year, composed of the various indications related to the power of the brand, in which Keio was the top in 2014, and ranked second in 2015 and 2016 in Greater Tokyo Area. Webometrics (2008) also ranks Keio University as 3rd in Japan, 11th in Asia, and 208th in the world for quantity and quality of web presence and link visibility.

In a unique ranking, TBS ranked Japanese universities by the questionnaire "Which university student do you want to have as your boyfriend?" to 300 girls in Shibuya, and Keio was ranked 1st in this ranking.

Evaluation from Business World

Finance

According to Keio's financial report, there was an operating revenue of 197 billion yen in 2010. The top three largest incomes were from "tuition and fees", "medical care" and "capital gain", with 49 billion yen, 48 billion yen and 21 billion yen respectively. The number of endowments in 2010 was about 5 billion yen. Keio is known for having one of the largest financial endowments of any Japanese university.

On the other hand, the top 3 largest expenses in 2010 were "Compensation and benefits", "Education & Research" and "Investment", with 65 billion yen, 52 billion yen and 33 billion yen respectively. The total asset value in 2010 was about 364 billion yen with an increase of 5 billion yen. In addition, the total amount of assets under management was approximately 109 billion yen in 2010, composed mainly of cash, deposits with banks and marketable securities.

Tuition fees

The university tuition fee system in Japan is different from other countries and very complicated. In most Japanese universities, more payments are required in the first year, such as "entrance fees", and less in subsequent years. There are several types of fees (some of which must be paid only once and some of which must be paid once or twice every year) and the so-called "course fee" is officially only one of those fees.

At Keio University, tuition fees vary and depend on the course. Social Science & Humanity studies have the lowest fees at approximately 1,110,000 yen per year, and the School of Medicine is the most expensive fee at about 3,610,000 yen per year. The tuition fees for the various graduate schools are much less than those for undergraduate studies, e.g. 690,000 yen per year for Social Science & Humanities and 1,313,000 yen per year for School of Medicine.

Although it is acceptable to pay twice with half in spring and half in autumn, the "entrance fee" must be paid before enrollment. The entrance fee for undergraduate study is 200,000 yen and the one for graduate study is 310,000 yen.

Scholarship/loan

Many students receive additional financial support. For example, in 2008, there were 9,764 students (about 30% of all students) who used either scholarships or loans. Additionally, Keio funds over 3,000 students who receive, on average, scholarships of 300,000 yen.

Organization

Faculties
Keio has ten undergraduate faculties, which cover a wide range of academic fields, with each operating independently and offering broad educational and research activities. The faculties, with a planned annual number of enrolled first-year students in parentheses, are:

 Faculty of Letters (800)
 Faculty of Economics (1200)
 Faculty of Law (1200)
 Faculty of Business and Commerce (1000)
 School of Medicine (112)
 Faculty of Science and Technology (932)
 Faculty of Policy Management (425)
 Faculty of Environment and Information Studies (425)
 Faculty of Nursing and Medical Care (100)
 Faculty of Pharmacy (210)

Graduate schools

In addition to the ten undergraduate faculties listed above, Keio has fourteen graduate schools. Many professors are associated with both an undergraduate faculty and a graduate school.

 Graduate School of Letters
 Graduate School of Economics
 Graduate School of Law
 Graduate School of Human Relations
 Graduate School of Business and Commerce
 Graduate School of Medicine
 Graduate School of Science and Technology
 Graduate School of Business Administration
 Graduate School of Media and Governance
 Graduate School of Health Management
 Graduate School of Pharmaceutical Sciences
 Law School
 Graduate School of Media Design
 Graduate School of System Design and Management

Media centers

Keio's Media Centers, with combined holdings of over 4.58 million books and publications, are one of the largest academic information storehouses in the country.
 Mita Media Center
 Hiyoshi Media Center
 Media Center for Science and Technology
 Shinanomachi Media Center
 SFC Media Center

Information technology centers
 ITC Headquarters
 Mita ITC
 Hiyoshi ITC
 Shinanomachi ITC
 Science & Technology ITC
 Shonan Fujisawa ITC

Affiliated schools
Elementary education
 Keio Yochisha Elementary School
 Keio Yokohama Elementary School

Secondary education
 Keio Futsubu School (Boys Junior High School)
 Keio Chutobu Junior High School
 Keio Shonan Fujisawa Junior and Senior High School
 Keio Senior High School
 Keio Shiki Senior High School
 Keio Girls Senior High School
 Keio Academy of New York (High School)

Language education
 Japanese Language Program
 Keio Foreign Language School

Others
 Keio Marunouchi City Campus (KMCC)

Hospital 
Keio University Hospital is one of the largest and most well-known general hospitals in Japan, the number of surgeries for carcinoma uteri in 2007 was top and the one for lung cancer was third among all university hospitals. and is also a famous teaching hospital. The number of trainee doctors who selected Keio as their first choice training hospital was 30 (33rd) among all Japanese teaching hospitals in 2010. Established in 1920, it has over 1,000 beds, a leading laboratory, and research and medical information divisions.

Campuses
There are eleven campuses.

Mita Campus (2-15-45 Mita, Minato, Tokyo)
Hiyoshi Campus (4-1-1 Hiyoshi, Kohoku, Yokohama, Kanagawa), home of the Hiyoshi tunnels
Yagami Campus (3-14-1 Hiyoshi, Kohoku, Yokohama, Kanagawa)
Shinanomachi Campus (35 Shinanomachi, Shinjuku, Tokyo)
Shonan Fujisawa Campus (Fujisawa, Kanagawa, aka SFC) designed by Fumihiko Maki
Shiba Kyoritsu Campus (Minato ward, Tokyo)
Shin-Kawasaki Town Campus (Kawasaki, Kanagawa)
Tsuruoka Town Campus of Keio (Tsuruoka, Yamagata, aka TTCK)
Urawa Kyoritsu Campus (Urawa, Saitama)
Keio Osaka Riverside Campus (Osaka)
Keio Marunouchi City Campus (Tokyo)

Alumni and professors
Some of the prominent Keio alumni include Japanese Prime Ministers Junichiro Koizumi (2001–2006), Ryutaro Hashimoto (1996–1998), and Tsuyoshi Inukai (1931–1932). Dozens of other alumni have been cabinet members and governors in the post-war period. Its alumni include 230 CEOs of major companies and 97 CEOs of foreign-affiliated companies (both highest in Japan). Keio has over 320,000 alumni in 866 alumni associations.

Politicians

 Junichiro Koizumi, the 87th/88th/89th Prime Minister of Japan (2001–2006), the 20th President of Liberal Democratic Party of Japan (Economics, 1967)
 Ryutaro Hashimoto, the 82nd/83rd Prime Minister of Japan (1996–1998), the 17th President of Liberal Democratic Party of Japan (Law, 1960)
 Tsuyoshi Inukai, the 29th Prime Minister of Japan (1931–1932), the 6th President of Rikken Seiyūkai
 Ichirō Ozawa, Former President of Democratic Party of Japan, Former Secretary General of Liberal Democratic Party of Japan (Economics, 1967)
 Tamisuke Watanuki, President of People's New Party, Former Speaker of The House of Representatives of Japan (Economics, 1950)
 Toshiko Hamayotsu, Minister for Global Environmental Issues and Director-General of Environment Agency of Government of Japan (1994).
 Kenji Kosaka, Minister of Education, Culture, Sports, Science and Technology (Law, 1968)
 Jirō Kawasaki, Minister of Health, Labour and Welfare (Business and Commerce, 1971)
 Andrew Thomson, Minister for Sport and Tourism and Minister Assisting the Prime Minister for the Sydney 2000 Games in the Australian Government 1997 – 1998
 Shigefumi Matsuzawa, Governor of Kanagawa (Law, 1982)
 Akihiko Noro, Governor of Mie (Science and Technology, 1969)
 Genjirō Kaneko, Minister of Agriculture, Forestry and Fisheries (2021-2022), Governor of Nagasaki (Letters, 1968)
 Motohiro Ōno, Governor of Saitama (Law, 1987)
 Hiroshi Nakai, Chairman of the National Commission on Public Safety, Minister of State for Disaster Management and the Abduction Issue (Economics, 1969)
 Yūzan Fujita, Governor of Hiroshima (Business and Commerce, 1972)
 Ryōzō Hiranuma, Mayor of Yokohama, Order of Culture
 Keiichi Inamine, Governor of Okinawa (Economics, 1957)
 Masaharu Ikuta, President of Japan Post, Former CEO of Mitsui O.S.K. Lines (Economics, 1957)
 Yukio Ozaki, Mayor of Tokyo, Minister of Justice, Education, "Father of parliamentary politics" in Japan.
 Nobuteru Ishihara, Minister of Land, Infrastructure and Transport, Minister of State for Administrative and Regulatory Reform, Candidate for the LDP presidency 2008
 Heitaro Inagaki, Minister of Economy, Trade and Industry (Economics, 1913)
 Banri Kaieda, Minister of Economy, Trade and Industry (Law)
 Hirofumi Nakasone, Minister for Foreign Affairs
 Yoshio Sakurauchi, Minister for Foreign Affairs
 Kamata Eikichi, Minister of Education
 Hidenao Nakagawa, Chief Cabinet Secretary
 Mitsuo Horiuchi, Minister of International Trade and Industry
 Yoshiyuki Kamei, Minister of Agriculture, Forestry and Fisheries
 Seiichi Ota, Minister of Agriculture, Forestry and Fisheries
 Ryu Shionoya, Minister of Education, Science and Technology
 Kosuke Hori, Minister of Education
 Fusanosuke Kuhara, Minister of communications
 Shigeru Ishiba, Minister of Defense, Minister of Agriculture, Forestry and Fisheries (Law, 1979)
 Kazuyoshi Kaneko, Minister of Land, Infrastructure, Transport and Tourism and Minister for Ocean Policy
 Takeo Kawamura, Minister of Education, Science and Technology and Chief Cabinet Secretary
 Koichi Yamamoto, Minister of Environment
 Akira Amari, Minister of Economy, Trade and Industry and Minister of State in charge of Administrative Reform
 Tatsuya Ito, Minister of State for Financial Services
 Tadamori Oshima, Minister of Agriculture
 Takeo Hiranuma, Minister of Transport and Minister of Economy, Trade, and Industry
 Akira Nagatsuma, Minister of Health, Labour and Welfare, Minister of State for Pension Reform
 Masajuro Shiokawa, Chief Cabinet Secretary of Japan
 Heizō Takenaka, Minister of Internal Affairs and Communications (Emeritus Prof.)
 Wataru Takeshita, Minister for Reconstruction
 Jon Richards, Wisconsin legislator
 Sommai Hoonrakoon, Minister of Finance (Thailand) (Economics, 1942)
 Set Aung – politician, economist and management consultant, incumbent Deputy Planning and Finance Minister of Myanmar
 Yun Duk-min  ambassador of South Korea to Japan

Public servants, international organizations 
 Takeshi Kasai, WHO Regional Director of Western Pacific (medicine, 1990)
 Shigeru Omi (undergraduate atten.), WHO Regional Director of Western Pacific,
 Kiyoko Okabe, the first female justice of the Supreme Court of Japan (Master, Law, 1974)
 Taro Takemi, president of the World Medical Association and Japan Medical Association (MD, medicine, 1930)
 Ichirō Fujisaki, Diplomat, Chairman of Executive Committee of United Nations High Commissioner for Refugees (Economics (dropout), 1969)

Central Bank Governors 
 Shigeaki Ikeda, Minister of Finance, Commerce and Industry, Governor of The Bank of Japan
 Makoto Usami, Governor of The Bank of Japan
 Tarisa Watanagase (Thai), Governor of the Bank of Thailand, 2006–2010 (Economics)
 Chang Kia-ngau (Economics, 1906–1908), Governor of the Central Bank of Republic of China

Astronauts
 Chiaki Mukai, JAXA astronaut (MD, medicine, 1988)
 Akihiko Hoshide, JAXA astronaut

Finance
 Taizo Nishimuro, Chairman and CEO of Tokyo Stock Exchange, Former CEO of Toshiba Corporation (Economics 1961)
 Koichiro Miyahara, Chairman and CEO of Tokyo Stock Exchange
 Atsushi Saito, Chairman and CEO of Tokyo Stock Exchange,
 Shigeharu Suzuki, President and CEO of Daiwa Securities Group (Economics 1971)

Media

 Tōru Shōriki, owner of The Yomiuri Shimbun (Economics, 1942)
 Tarō Kimura, journalist (Law, 1964)
 Akira Ikegami, journalist (Economics, 1973)
 Kazuhiko Torishima, president of Hakusensha (Law, 1976)
 Motoaki Tanigo, CEO of Hololive Production (Science and Technology)

Other business people
 Akio Toyoda, President and CEO Toyota Motor Corporation 2009–current
 Yutaka Asoh, later known as Yutaka Katayama, the first president of the U.S. operations of Nissan Motors (Economics 1935)
Osamu Nagayama (born 1947), CEO of Chugai Pharmaceutical and Chairman of Sony Corporation
 Katsuaki Watanabe, President of Toyota Motor Corporation (Economics 1964).
 Yuzaburo Mogi, Chairman and CEO of Kikkoman Corporation (Law 1958)
 Yotaro Kobayashi (Economics, 1956), chairman of Fuji Xerox, former chairman of Japan Association of Corporate Executives
 Shinzo Maeda, President and CEO of Shiseido (Letters 1970)
 Hidetaka Miyazaki, President of FromSoftware
 Ichizō Kobayashi, Founder of Hankyu Railway and the Takarazuka Revue, Minister of Commerce and Industry in the 1940 Konoe Cabinet
 Nobutada Saji, Chief executive of Suntory Ltd., the wealthiest individual in Japan as of 2004 by Forbes
 Akira Mori, President and CEO of Mori Trust, the fourth-wealthiest person in Japan as of 2013 by Forbes
Keiichi Ishizaka, chairman and CEO, Warner Music Japan Inc. (Business and Commerce, 1968) – 2009 Medal of Honor Awardee
Lee Jae-yong, vice chairman of Samsung Electronics (MBA 1995)
Teruaki Yamagishi, received the 4th Class, Order of the Rising Sun Gold Rays with Rosette in 2008
Takeo Shiina, Chairman of IBM Japan, former Chairman of Japan Association of Corporate Executives (Science and Technology 1951)

Academia
Dozens of alumni and professors have been elected as academy members or in important positions.
 Yukichi Fukuzawa (founder), First President of Japan Academy, the current portrait of 10,000-yen notes
 Kitasato Shibasaburō (first dean of Keio University School of Medicine), Member of Japan Academy, a fellow of Royal Society of London, nominated for Nobel Prize
 Genichi Kato (professor), Nominated for Nobel Prize, Member of Japan Academy
 Shinzo Koizumi (politics, 1910), Member of Japan Academy, best known as the educator of His Majesty the Emperor Emeritus at the age of the prince. Received an honorary doctorate from Columbia University
 Keisuke Suzuki (professor), Member of Japan Academy
 Sho-Chieh Tsiang (undergraduate atten.), member of Academia Sinica
 Atsuo Iiyoshi (engineering, 1960), emeritus professor of Kyoto University, an honorary doctorate of Russian Academy of Sciences
  Seiichiro Takahashi (politics, 1908), Member of Japan Academy, Minister of Education 
 Toshihiko Izutsu (literature, 1937), Member of Japan Academy
Akira Hayami (economics, 1954), Member of Japan Academy, coined the notion of "Industrious Revolution"
 Tokuzo Fukuda (prof.), Member of Japan Academy
 Kazui Tashiro (Ph.D. in economics), Member of Japan Academy,
Junzaburo Nishiwaki (economics, 1917), nominated for Nobel Prize, International Honorary Member of American Academy of Arts and Sciences
Tsuneo Tomita (medicine, 1932), International Honorary Member of American Academy of Arts and Sciences, Member of Japan Academy, Professor Emeritus of Yale University
Osamu Saito (Hitotsubashi University) (economics, 1968), member of Japan Academy, International Honorary Member of American Academy of Arts and Sciences, Professor Emeritus of Hitotsubashi University
 Ryogo Kubo (professor), the Boltzmann Medal, Order of Culture, member of Japan Academy, International Honorary Member of American Academy of Arts and Sciences
Mikinosuke Miyajima (professor), International Honorary Member of American Academy of Arts and Sciences, Japan's representative for League of Nations Health Organization.
David J. Farber, fellow, American Association for the Advancement of Science (the Distinguished Professor and Co-Director of Cyber Civilization Research Center)
 Hiromoto Watanabe (1865), the first President of Tokyo Imperial University
 Hamao Arata (1869), the third and eighth President of the Tokyo Imperial University
 Sahachiro Hata (Prof.), nominated for Nobel Prize, member of Japan Academy,
 Masayuki Amagai (medicine, 1985), International Member of National Academy of Medicine
 Masaharu Tsuchiya (medicine, 1953), member of Académie Nationale de Médecine,
 Masaki Kitajima (medicine, 1966), Honorary Fellow of Royal College of Surgeons of England, member of European Academy of Science
 Ken Sakamura (engineering, 1974), emeritus professor of University of Tokyo, Japan Academy Prize (academics), the creator of the real-time operating system architecture TRON project
 Takao Suzuki (sociolinguist) (literature, 1950), former professor of Yale University
 Toshio Ito (Medicine), best known for the discovery of Ito cell, Japan Academy Prize (academics),
 Hideyuki Okano (medicine, 1983), the first in the world to produce transgenic marmosets (Callithrix jacchus) with germline transmission. Besides, he is to conduct the world's first clinical test in which artificially derived stem cells will be used to treat patients with spinal cord injuries.
 Toju Hata (medicine, 1934), Japan Academy Prize (academics), best known for the discovery of Mitomycin C,
 Yoshitaka Tanimura, derived Hierarchical equations of motion with Ryogo Kubo, Professor of Kyoto University, Humboldt Prize Winner (Sci.and Tech)

 Katsuhiko Mikoshiba (medicine, 1969), Emeritus Professor of The University of Tokyo, first cloned in the world of the IP3 receptor in the laboratory, which was found to play an important role in many biological functions such as body development and brain plasticity. Legion of Honor, honorary doctorate from Karolinska Institute (2011), Japan Academy Prize (academics)
Kuniaki Tatsuta (PhD, 1969), the first in the world to synthesize totally four big Antibiotics (aminoglycoside, -lactam, macrolide and tetracycline antibiotics), which was accomplished by using carbohydrates as chiral sources in their laboratories. Japan Academy Prize (academics),Ernest Guenther Award(2013)
 Hikohjiro Kaneko (Ph.D. in Literature, 1946), Japan Academy Prize (academics)
 Tatsuya Sakamoto (Economics, 1979), Japan Academy Prize (academics)
 Masayoshi Tomizuka, professor in Control Theory in the Department of Mechanical Engineering, and director of Mechanical Systems Control Laboratory, University of California, Berkeley. He holds the Cheryl and John Neerhout, Jr., Distinguished Professorship Chair, and has supervised more than 90 PhD students to completion, many of which have become professors in universities in the USA, Taiwan, etc., prestigious for the research in the field of Mechanical Engineering. (B.S. and M.S. degrees, Mechanical Engineering, 1968 and 1970)
 Shosuke Okamoto (medicine, 1941), first synthesized in 1962 Tranexamic acid with Utako Okamoto. Emeritus professor of Kobe University
Tatsuji Nomura (medicine, 1945), a pioneer in the development of laboratory animals with the aim of assuring the reproducibility of experimental results in medical research. Medal of Honor With Purple Ribbon from Japanese Government(1984).
Fumiko Yonezawa (Emeritus), The first female President of The Physical Society of Japan, the Laureate of L'Oréal-UNESCO For Women in Science Awards in 2005.
Shuichi Nosé (professor), famous for the Nosé–Hoover thermostat
 Yasuhiro Matsuda, professor of international politics at the University of Tokyo (Law)
 Yoshihiro Tsurumi, professor of international business at Baruch College of the City University of New York (Economics)
 Jun Murai, "The Father of The Internet" in Japan, Legion of Honor (2018) (PhD, Engineering)
Kohei Itoh (physicist), Successfully generated and detected quantum entanglement between electron spin and nuclear spin in phosphorus impurities added to silicon with Dr John Morton at Oxford University. This is the world's first successful generation. (Science and Technology)
 Yasuhiro Koike, Developed the High-bandwidth graded-index plastic optical fibre.He is thought as one of the Nobel Prize candidates in Physics in terms of the achievement of plastic optical fibre. (Sci. and Tech)
 Masaru Tomita, Established the metabolomics analysis by using the CE-MS. (Environment and Information Studies)
Eitaro Noro, Marxian Economist. The Author of "History of the Development of Japanese Capitalism"(1930) (Native:「日本資本主義発達史講座」), Iwanami Shoten, Tokyo

Art
 Shotaro Yasuoka, Member of Japan Art Academy
 Yamamoto Kenkichi, Member of Japan Art Academy
 Hiroshi Sakagami, Member of Japan Art Academy
 Shusaku Endo (Literature, 1948) Akutagawa Prize, Order of Culture, honorary doctorate from Georgetown University
 Daigaku Horiguchi, Poet, Translator, Member of Japan Art Academy
 Yone Noguchi (undergraduate attendee, professor), poet
 Tanaka Chikao, Member of Japan Art Academy (Literature)
Rofū Miki (undergraduate attendee), poet
 Gozo Yoshimasu, Member of Japan Art Academy
 Jun Etō, Member of Japan Art Academy, literary critic
 Mantaro Kubota, Member of Japan Art Academy
 Haruo Sato, Member of Japan Art Academy (Literature)
 Kafū Nagai, Member of Japan Art Academy, Order of Culture (Prof.)
 Shinobu Orikuchi, Ethnologist (Emeritus prof.)
 Takitaro Minakami, author (Economics)
 Yojiro Ishizaka, author (Literature)
 Sakutarō Hagiwara, Poet
 Yumeno Kyūsaku, Surrealistic detective novelist
 Kazuki Kaneshiro, Zainichi Korean novelist
Kôhei Tsuka, playwright, theatre director, and screenwriter
Adebayo Adewusi, Lawyer and Public Administrator.
 Yoshio Taniguchi (Engineering, 1960), member of Japan Art Academy. Architect best known for his redesign of the Museum of Modern Art in New York City which was reopened on November 20, 2004, 
Fumihiko Maki (Keio High school, undergraduate attend.), International Honorary Member of American Academy of Arts and Sciences, Wolf Prize in Arts,
Kyoko Matsuoka, author and translator of children's literature

Others
 Ryuichi Kuki, Envoy Extraordinary and Minister Plenipotentiary, Governor of The Imperial Museum (The Tokyo National Museum, Kyoto National Museum, and Nara National Museum), The Father of Syuzo Kuki (1874)
 Theodor Holm "Ted" Nelson, Computer architect, visionary, and contrarian (PhD, Media and Governance, 2002)
 Yuichi Motai, professor of Virginia Commonwealth University (Computer Engineering), NSF Career Award (2011)
 Wataru Kamimura, professional shogi player (the first university graduate to become a shogi professional) (Science and Technology / mathematical sciences, 2013)
 Joi Ito, former director of the MIT Media Lab, professor at Massachusetts Institute of Technology and Harvard University (PhD, Media and Governance, 2018)
 Yūka Nishio, voice actress and musician
 Ghib Ojisan, a travel YouTuber based in Singapore

Gutenberg Bible
The only copy of the Gutenberg Bible held outside Europe or North America is the first volume of the Hubay 45 copy at Keio University. It was purchased by the university in 1996 from Maruzen booksellers, who originally purchased the copy at auction in 1987 for US$5.4 million.

The Humanities Media Interface Project (HUMI) at Keio University is known for its high-quality digital images of Gutenberg Bibles and other rare books. Under the direction of Professor Toshiyuki Takamiya, the HUMI team has made digital reproductions of eleven sets of the bible in nine institutions, including in 2000, both full-text facsimiles held in the collection of the British Library.

Bibliography

Notes

References

See also
 Keio Medical Science Prize
 Keio Media Centers (Libraries)
 Eliica
 Auto-ID Labs
 Keio University Shonan Fujisawa Campus
 Keio Shonan-Fujisawa Junior & Senior High School
 Sakura Tsushin ("Sakura Diaries"), a manga and anime series by U-Jin which prominently features Keio University.
List of National Treasures of Japan (crafts: others)

External links

 
Keio University, Institute for Advanced Biosciences/TTCK
Shonan Fujisawa Campus
Keio Academy of New York
Keio Organization for Global Initiatives (OGI)

 
Educational institutions established in 1858
Minato, Tokyo
Private universities and colleges in Japan
Universities and colleges in Kanagawa Prefecture
1858 establishments in Japan
American football in Japan
Kantoh Collegiate American Football Association Top 8 university
Universities and colleges in Tokyo